Arizona's 11th Legislative District is one of 30 in the state, covers parts of Pima and Pinal counties. As of 2021, there are 61 precincts in the district, 34 in Pima and 27 in Pinal, with a total registered voter population of  168,674. The district has an overall population of 235,634.

Political representation
The district is represented for the 2021–2022 Legislative Session in the State Senate by Vince Leach (R) and in the House of Representatives by Mark Finchem (R) and Teresa Martinez (R).

References

Pima County, Arizona
Pinal County, Arizona
Arizona legislative districts